Production management or production manager may refer to:

 Manufacturing process management, technologies and methods used to define how products are to be manufactured
 Production manager (music), in charge of the technical crew
 Production manager (theatre), responsible for realizing a production within constraints of technical possibility
 Unit production manager, responsible for performing various job duties given by the line producer in a film or television show production office. Related terms include production coordinator, production supervisor, and executive in charge of production.
 Project production management, application of operations management to the delivery of capital projects

See also 
 International Journal of Operations & Production Management
 Manufacturing operations management
 Production and Operations Management
 Operations management
 Production control
 Production engineering
 Production planning
 Production support
 Supply chain management